Van I. Ward (September 6, 1884 – c. March 4, 1919) was an American football coach. He was the head football coach at Kalamazoo College in Kalamazoo, Michigan.  He held that position for the 1909 season.  His coaching record at Kalamazoo was 4–2.

His obituary appeared in the Kalamazoo Gazette on March 4, 1919.

References

1884 births
1919 deaths
Kalamazoo Hornets football coaches